Xi'an University of Technology (XUT) is a provincial public comprehensive university in Xi'an, Shaanxi, China. The university is co-sponsored by the Ministry of Industry and Information Technology and the Shaanxi Provincial Government. 

As of February 2019, the university has 3 campuses, a combined student body of 18,000 students and 1,672 faculty members. The university consists of 16 faculties and 1 department.

At present, the university has 32 national and provincial key scientific research bases, including 1 National Key Laboratory, 1 National Engineering Research Center, 2 Key Laboratories of the Ministry of education, 1 Engineering Research Center of the Ministry of Education, 1 Promotion Center of the Ministry of Science and Technology, and 1 Key Laboratory of the National Forestry and Grassland Administration.

History
The school traces its origins to the former Beijing Institute of Machinery and Shaanxi University of Technology, founded in 1949 and 1960, respectively, and would later become Shaanxi Institute of Machinery in 1972. In January 1994, Shaanxi Institute of Machinery was officially renamed Xi'an University of Technology, which is still used today. In 2002, Xi'an Instrument Industry School was merged into the university.

Schools and Departments
 Faculty of Materials Science and Engineering
 Faculty of Mechanical and Precision Instrument Engineering
 Faculty of Automation and Information Engineering
 Faculty of Water Resources and Hydroelectric Engineering
 Faculty of Printing and Packaging Engineering
 Faculty of Economics and Management
 Faculty of Sciences
 Faculty of Humanities and Foreign Languages
 Faculty of Computer Science and Engineering
 Faculty of Civil Engineering and Architecture
 Faculty of Art and Design
 Faculty of Further Education
 Faculty of Higher Vacational and Technical Education

Library
As of May 2015, the library has collected more than 1.88 million volumes of paper documents, about 3.29 million volumes of electronic documents, more than 2,300 kinds of paper-based Chinese and foreign journals, and more than 10,000 kinds of full-text electronic journals.

Culture
 Motto: Motherland, Honor, Responsibility
 University newspaper: Journal of Xi'an University of Technology

Notable alumni
 Yao Mu, member of the Chinese Academy of Engineering (CAE).
 , member of the Chinese Academy of Engineering (CAE).
 Shan Zhongde, member of the Chinese Academy of Engineering (CAE).
 , hydrographer.
 Wang Qian, professor at Northwest University (United States).
 , Vice Chairman of the CPPCC Shaanxi Provincial Committee.
 , Vice-Governor of Shaanxi.

References

External links

 
Universities and colleges in Shaanxi
Educational institutions established in 1949
Education in Xi'an
1949 establishments in China